The 1946 Southeastern Louisiana Lions football team was an American football team that represented Southeastern Louisiana College (now known as Southeastern Louisiana University) as a member of the Louisiana Intercollegiate Conference (LIC) during the 1946 college football season. In their first year under head coach Ned McGehee, the Lions compiled a 9–0 record, won the LIC championship, defeated  in the second annual Burley Bowl game, and outscored opponents by a total of 236 to 46.

Southeastern Louisians ranked eighth nationally among small-college teams with an average of 298.4 yards per game in total offense. It also ranked ninth nationally in total defense, giving up an average of only 142.7 yards per game.

The team featured two brothers from Massachusetts, Albert and Louis Romboli, playing at the halfback position.

During the fall of 1946, there were over 1,000 persons enrolled at Southeastern Louisiana, of which 70% were men. The football team had over 50 players.

Schedule

References

Southeastern Louisiana
Southeastern Louisiana Lions football seasons
Southeastern Louisiana Lions football
College football undefeated seasons